The Men's 62 kg weightlifting competitions at the 2016 Summer Olympics in Rio de Janeiro took place on 8 August at the Pavilion 2 of Riocentro.

Schedule
All times are Time in Brazil (UTC-03:00)

Records
Prior to this competition, the existing world and Olympic records were as follows.

Results

References

Weightlifting at the 2016 Summer Olympics
Men's events at the 2016 Summer Olympics